The Arts Fuse is an online arts magazine covering cultural events in Greater Boston, as well as Connecticut, Maine, Massachusetts, New Hampshire, Rhode Island, Vermont, and New York.

The Arts Fuse has published more than 2,000 articles and provides criticism, previews, interviews, and commentary on dance, film, food, literature, music, theater, television, video games, and visual arts.

As Editor-in-Chief of The Arts Fuse, a non-profit web magazine Marx launched in July 2007, Bill Marx helped increase editorial coverage of the arts and culture across Greater Boston. Bill Marx began publishing The Arts Fuse in reaction to the declining arts coverage in newspapers, magazines, radio, and television, creating a site that could experiment with professional online arts criticism, looking at new and innovative ways to use online platforms to evolve cultural conversations and bring together critics, readers, and artists.

Notable writers and critics for The Arts Fuse have included Peter-Adrian Cohen, Maryann Corbett, Franklin Einspruch, Helen Epstein, Jim Kates, Bill Marx, Gerald Peary and Vincent Czyz.

In 2011, The Arts Fuse received a grant from Mass Humanities for its Judicial Review, an online, in-depth, and interactive discussion of the issues raised by the arts on The Arts Fuse. The Arts Fuse also won CBS Boston's
Most Valuable Blogger Award in 2011.

References

External links
The Arts Fuse official site
Arts Fuse Editor Bill Marx Talks at Boston University about Arts Coverage, Teaching, and Books in Translation
Podcast: MIT Communications Forum: "The Culture Beat and New Media: Arts Journalism in the Internet Era" with Bill Marx and Doug McLellan

2007 establishments in Massachusetts
Local interest magazines published in the United States
Magazines established in 2007
Magazines published in Boston
Online magazines published in the United States
Visual arts magazines published in the United States